Oberönz was a municipality in the district of Wangen in the canton of Bern in Switzerland.

On January 1, 2008, the municipality of Oberönz became part of the municipality of Herzogenbuchsee.

History
Oberönz is first mentioned in 1246 as Onza.

Geography
Of this area, 48.5% is used for agricultural purposes, while 37.8% is forested. The rest of the land, (13.7%) is settled.

Demographics
Before the merger, Oberönz has a population of 941.  , 11.3% of the population was made up of foreign nationals.  Over the last 10 years the population has grown at a rate of 8.2%.  Most of the population speaks German (90.8%), with Turkish being second most common (3.6%) and Albanian being third (2.3%).

In the 2007 election the most popular party was the SVP which received 35.2% of the vote.  The next three most popular parties were the SPS (25.7%), the FDP (14.5%) and the Green Party (7.1%).

The age distribution of the population is children and teenagers (0–19 years old) make up 23.8% of the population, while adults (20–64 years old) make up 61.4% and seniors (over 64 years old) make up 14.9%.  The entire Swiss population is generally well educated.  In Oberönz about 76.7% of the population (between age 25-64) have completed either non-mandatory upper secondary education or additional higher education (either University or a Fachhochschule).

Oberönz had an unemployment rate of 1.46%.  , there were 23 people employed in the primary economic sector and about 9 businesses involved in this sector.  187 people are employed in the secondary sector and there are 6 businesses in this sector.  39 people are employed in the tertiary sector, with 13 businesses in this sector.
The historical population is given in the following table:

References

External links

Former municipalities of the canton of Bern